Kenji may refer to:

Kenji (given name), a masculine Japanese given name, and list of people & characters with this name
Kenji (era), a Japanese era spanned from 1275 to 1278
Kenji (manga) (拳児), a 1980s manga by Matsuda Ryuchi
Gyakuten Kenji or Ace Attorney Investigations: Miles Edgeworth, a 2009 adventure video game
J. Kenji López-Alt, an American chef and food writer
"Kenji", a song on Fort Minor's 2005 album The Rising Tied

See also
 Genji (disambiguation)